Valentin Pyanov (born July 21, 1991) is a Russian professional ice hockey player. He is currently under contract with HC Sibir Novosibirsk of the Kontinental Hockey League (KHL).

Pyanov made his KHL debut playing with Avangard Omsk during the 2012–13 season.

References

External links

1991 births
Living people
Amur Khabarovsk players
Ariada Volzhsk players
Avangard Omsk players
HC Lada Togliatti players
Omskie Yastreby players
HC Dynamo Pardubice players
Russian ice hockey forwards
Saryarka Karagandy players
HC Sibir Novosibirsk players
Sibirskie Snaipery players
Sportspeople from Omsk
Yermak Angarsk players
Russian expatriate ice hockey people
Russian expatriate sportspeople in the Czech Republic
Russian expatriate sportspeople in Kazakhstan
Expatriate ice hockey players in Kazakhstan
Expatriate ice hockey players in the Czech Republic